Khalid Al Hud Al Gargani, also known as Khalid Al Hud, was a Libyan businessman and one of the most influential advisors of King Abdulaziz, founder of the Kingdom of Saudi Arabia in 1932, during the 1930s.

Biography
Khalid Al Hud was a Libyan businessman who had contacts with German companies in the 1930s. He was part of the eight-member political committee at the Saudi royal court. 

He was the principal envoy of the King in regard to the procurement of arms from the European states. A meeting was planned with the Italian officials for this purpose in 1937, but Khalid Al Hud could not attend the meeting due to his illness. He was sent to Germany as an emissary of the King to negotiate the arm sales in 1939. There he met with Joachim von Ribbentrop, Nazi's foreign minister, on 8 June. During the meeting Khalid Al Hud asked the Germans to establish a small rifle and munitions factory in Saudi Arabia and to sell the armoured cars and anti-aircraft weapons to strengthen the Kingdom's defense. Then on 17 June he met with Adolf Hitler in Berchtesgaden, Germany. He submitted a personal letter from King Abdulaziz to Hitler who stated in the meeting that Nazi Germany would be pleased to have good relations with Saudi Arabia due to the fact that both states had the same opponents, Jewish people. Khalid Al Hud's mission was a success in that the Germans agreed to provide weapons that Saudi Arabia requested. However, any agreement was signed and therefore, the mission was not materialized partly due to the outbreak of World War II on 3 September 1939.

Khalid Al Hud was father-in-law of Abdul Rahman Azzam Pasha, an Egyptian diplomat.

References

Kh
Kh
Kh
Kh
Year of birth missing
Year of death missing